Zacarías Bonnat Michel (born 27 February 1996) is a Dominican weightlifter. He won the silver medal in the men's 81 kg event at the 2020 Summer Olympics in Tokyo, Japan.

He won the bronze medal in the 89 kg category at the 2022 Pan American Weightlifting Championships held in Bogotá, Colombia.

In December 2022, he was provisionally suspended after testing positive for a banned substance. As a consequence, he was unable to compete at the 2022 World Weightlifting Championships in Bogotá, Colombia.

References

Living people
1996 births
Dominican Republic male weightlifters
Pan American Games medalists in weightlifting
Weightlifters at the 2019 Pan American Games
Medalists at the 2019 Pan American Games
Pan American Weightlifting Championships medalists
Weightlifters at the 2020 Summer Olympics
Olympic weightlifters of the Dominican Republic
Olympic silver medalists for the Dominican Republic
Olympic medalists in weightlifting
Medalists at the 2020 Summer Olympics
People from Monte Plata Province
21st-century Dominican Republic people
Pan American Games silver medalists for the Dominican Republic
Doping cases in weightlifting
Dominican Republic sportspeople in doping cases